John Kevin Delaney (born April 16, 1963) is an American politician, businessman, and former attorney who was the United States representative for Maryland's 6th congressional district from 2013 to 2019. He was a candidate in the 2020 Democratic presidential primaries.

On July 28, 2017, Delaney became the first Democrat to announce his run for president in 2020. Delaney did not run for re-election to Congress in 2018, choosing to focus on his presidential campaign.  In November 2018, fellow Democrat David Trone was elected to succeed Delaney in Congress, and subsequently endorsed him for President in 2020. Delaney suspended his campaign on January 31, 2020, citing low poll numbers and wanting to avoid pulling support from other candidates. He later endorsed Joe Biden for president.

Early life and education
Delaney grew up in Wood-Ridge, New Jersey, the son of Elaine (Rowe), and Jack Delaney, an electrician. He is the nephew of former Aetna CEO John Rowe. He is of three quarters Irish and one quarter English descent. Delaney spent part of his youth working at his father's construction sites.

Delaney graduated from Bergen Catholic High School. Scholarships from his father's labor union (IBEW Local 164) as well as the American Legion, VFW, and the Lions Club helped Delaney attend college; he earned a B.A. degree from Columbia University in 1985, and a J.D. degree from Georgetown University Law Center in 1988.

Business career
Delaney co-founded two companies that were publicly traded on the New York Stock Exchange. He won the Ernst & Young Entrepreneur of the Year Award in 2004.

In 1993, Delaney co-founded Health Care Financial Partners (HCFP), to make loans available to smaller-sized health care service providers said to be ignored by larger banks. HCFP went public in 1996, and its stock began trading on the New York Stock Exchange in 1998. Health Care Financial Partners was acquired by Heller Financial in 1999.

In 2000, Delaney co-founded CapitalSource, a commercial lender headquartered in Chevy Chase, Maryland; the company provided capital to roughly 5,000 small and mid-size businesses before his departure. In 2010, while Delaney was CEO, CapitalSource was awarded a Bank Enterprise Award from the Community Development Financial Institutions Fund by the U.S. Treasury Department for its investment in low-income and economically distressed communities. In 2005, CapitalSource was named one of Washingtonian magazine's best places to work for its company culture and employee benefits.

CapitalSource continued to be publicly traded on the NYSE after Delaney's election, making him the only former CEO of a publicly traded company to serve in the 113th United States Congress. In 2014, the lender merged with PacWest Bancorp.

U.S. House of Representatives

Election

2012 

After redistricting following the 2010 census, Delaney decided to run for the newly redrawn 6th district against 10-term Republican incumbent Roscoe Bartlett. The district had long been a Republican stronghold, but it had been significantly reconfigured. The Maryland General Assembly shifted much of heavily Republican Carroll County and the more rural sections of Frederick County into the heavily Democratic 8th district. It also shifted Republican-tilting sections of Harford and Baltimore counties, as well as another section of Carroll, into the already heavily Republican 1st district. Taking their place was a heavily Democratic spur of western Montgomery County previously in the 8th District. The redrawn district's share of Montgomery County ended just two blocks from Delaney's home in Potomac. The redrawn district, the state's second-largest, included nearly the entire western portion of the state, but the bulk of its vote came from the outer suburbs of Washington, D.C.

On paper, this dramatically altered the district's demographics, turning it from a heavily Republican district into a Democratic-leaning district.  While John McCain carried the 6th with 57 percent of the vote in 2008, Barack Obama would have carried the new 6th with 56 percent. The Montgomery County share of the district has three times as many people as the rest of the district combined.

The shifts were quite controversial, as Republicans accused Democrats of shifting district boundaries in their favor, and former Governor Martin O'Malley later admitted the redrawn districts would favor Democrats. "That was my hope," O'Malley told attorneys in a deposition. "It was also my intent to create ... a district where the people would be more likely to elect a Democrat than a Republican."

During the primary, Delaney was endorsed by former President Bill Clinton, U.S. Congresswoman Donna Edwards, Comptroller Peter Franchot, The Washington Post, and the Gazette.

On April 3, 2012, Delaney won the five-candidate Democratic primary field with 54% of the vote. The next closest opponent, State Senator Robert J. Garagiola, received 29% of the vote, 25 points behind Delaney.

In the November 6, 2012 general election, Delaney defeated Bartlett by 59%–38%, a 21-point margin. He won the Montgomery County share of the district by almost 56,000 votes, accounting for almost all of the overall margin of 58,900 votes.

2014 

Delaney faced a closer-than-expected contest for reelection against Dan Bongino, the Republican candidate in 2012 for U.S. Senate from Maryland. While Delaney won just one of the district's five counties, that one county was Montgomery, which he carried by over 20,500 votes. Delaney ultimately won the race by just over 2,200 votes.

2016 

Delaney won a third term in 2016, taking 56 percent of the vote to Republican Amie Hoeber's 40 percent.

Tenure

Delaney introduced legislation to end partisan gerrymandering. The Open Our Democracy Act of 2017 would appoint independent redistricting commissions nationwide to end partisan gerrymandering, make Election Day a federal holiday, and create an open top-two primary system.

Delaney was ranked as the 53rd most bipartisan member of the U.S. House of Representatives during the 114th United States Congress (and the most bipartisan member of the U.S. House of Representatives from Maryland) in the Bipartisan Index created by The Lugar Center and the McCourt School of Public Policy that ranks members of the United States Congress by their degree of bipartisanship (by measuring the frequency each member's bills attract co-sponsors from the opposite party and each member's co-sponsorship of bills by members of the opposite party).  In 2015, a similar ranking by the nonpartisan site GovTrack ranked Delaney third highest for bipartisanship among all House Democrats.

Committee assignments
 Committee on Financial Services
 Subcommittee on Financial Institutions and Consumer Credit
 Subcommittee on Oversight and Investigations
 Joint Economic Committee

Caucus memberships
 New Democrat Coalition
 Congressional Arts Caucus
 Congressional Asian Pacific American Caucus
 Congressional NextGen 9-1-1 Caucus
 Climate Solutions Caucus

2020 presidential bid

Despite a rumored bid to run against governor Larry Hogan in 2018, Delaney bypassed the 2018 elections altogether. On July 28, 2017, he announced his run for president in 2020 in a Washington Post op-ed.

Delaney favored universal health coverage and proposed a public plan that would cover all Americans under the age of 65 (while leaving Medicare for those over 65 untouched). He opposed Medicare-for-all, arguing that advocacy for the policy would help incumbent President Donald Trump get re-elected. During a June 2019 debate, Delaney claimed that hospitals will be shuttered under Medicare for All; Politifact, the Washington Post fact-checker, and Kaiser Health News all found this claim to be false and unsubstantiated.

Delaney dropped out of the presidential race on January 31, 2020. He cited his failure to gain traction in polls and wanting to avoid pulling support from other moderate candidates as reasons behind the suspension of his campaign. On March 6, 2020, he endorsed Joe Biden.

Political positions

Delaney has been frequently referred to as a "moderate". However, he does not entirely identify as such. Delaney has remarked,

However, statements made since then suggest he has embraced the moderate label. Appearing on PBS NewsHour on May 8, 2019, Delaney remarked, "I am probably the most moderate candidate" in the field of 2020 Democratic presidential candidates.

He has received the top score of 100 from the Human Rights Campaign for his support of equality-related legislation, with him stating "No one should be discriminated against because of who they are or who they love" in response to this recognition.

Delaney has said he would support increasing the corporate tax rate from 21 percent to 23 percent "to raise about $200 billion for infrastructure".

Personal life
Delaney and his wife April (née McClain) met at Georgetown University Law Center; they have four daughters; Summer, Brooke, Lily, and Grace. April is the Washington, D.C. Director for Common Sense Media, a non-profit organization dedicated to educating families on social media while also conducting reviews and ratings for movies, TV series, and documentaries that show appropriate/inappropriate humor. Two of Delaney's four daughters attend Northwestern University while his oldest daughter, Summer, worked as a video journalist and multimedia reporter for Tribune Media and WPIX (PIX11) News.

Delaney is Catholic, and has said that "to some extent" his faith has guided his "social justice orientation". He was also a member of the Board of Directors of several organizations: St. Patrick's Episcopal Day School (Chairman), Georgetown University, National Symphony Orchestra, and the International Center for Research on Women.

References

External links

 Official website (archived)
 

 

1963 births
Candidates in the 2020 United States presidential election
21st-century American politicians
American people of English descent
American people of Irish descent
American Roman Catholics
Bergen Catholic High School alumni
Businesspeople from Maryland
Businesspeople from New Jersey
Catholics from Maryland
Catholics from New Jersey
Columbia College (New York) alumni
Democratic Party members of the United States House of Representatives from Maryland
Georgetown University Law Center alumni
Living people
New Jersey Democrats
People from Potomac, Maryland
People from Wood-Ridge, New Jersey